Fluting on the Hump is the first album by avant-garde band King Missile (Dog Fly Religion), first released exclusively in LP format in 1987 and later included on the CD compilation Mystical Shit & Fluting on the Hump.

Reception

AllMusic awarded Fluting on the Hump two out of five stars.

Track listing

Personnel
Adapted from the Fluting on the Hump liner notes.>

King Missile
 John S. Hall – lead vocals
 Dogbowl – guitar, backing vocals
 R.B. Korbet –drums, backing vocals, lead vocals (B2)
 Alex DeLaszlo – bass, harmonica, saxophone, backing vocals

Additional performers
 George O'Malley – xylophone, chimes, shouting

Production and design
 Mark Kramer – mixing, engineering

Release history

References

External links 
 
 
 Fluting on the Hump at iTunes

King Missile albums
1987 debut albums
Albums produced by Kramer (musician)
Shimmy Disc albums